Tsygankov is a surname. Notable people with the surname include:

Aleksandr Tsygankov (born 1968), Russian footballer and coach
Andrei Tsygankov, Russian-American international relations scholar and academic
Gennadiy Tsygankov (1947–2006), Soviet and Russian hockey player

See also
Tsyganov